Pieter Bukman (7 February 1934 – 15 March 2022) was a Dutch politician and diplomat of the Christian Democratic Appeal (CDA) party and economist.

Biography
Bukman attended a Gymnasium in Delft from April 1946 until June 1952 and applied at the Free University Amsterdam in July 1952 majoring in Economics obtaining a Bachelor of Economics degree in June 1954 before obtaining a Master of Economics degree in July 1958. Bukman worked as a trade association executive for the Christian Farmers and Gardeners Association (CBTB) from August 1958 until December 1980 and served as General-Secretary from May 1968 until September 1975 and as Chairman from September 1975 until December 1980.

Bukman served as Chairman of the Christian Democratic Appeal from 11 October 1980 until 14 July 1986. Bukman was elected as a Member of the Senate after the Senate election of 1981, taking office on 10 June 1981 serving as a frontbencher and spokesperson for Agriculture. Bukman also served as President of the European People's Party from 10 July 1985 until 30 July 1987. After the election of 1986 Bukman was appointed  Minister for Development Cooperation in the Cabinet Lubbers II, taking office on 14 July 1986. Bukman served as acting Minister of Defence from 6 September 1988 until 24 September 1988 following the resignation of Wim van Eekelen. The Cabinet Lubbers II fell on 3 May 1989 and continued to serve in a demissionary capacity. Bukman was elected as a Member of the House of Representatives after the election of 1989, taking office on 14 September 1989. Following the cabinet formation of 1989 Bukman was appointed State Secretary for Economic Affairs in the Cabinet Lubbers III, taking office on 7 November 1989. Bukman was appointed Minister of Agriculture, Nature and Fisheries following the resignation of Gerrit Braks, taking office on 28 September 1990. After the election of 1994 Bukman returned as a Member of the House of Representatives, taking office on 17 May 1994. The Cabinet Lubbers III was replaced by the Cabinet Kok I following the cabinet formation of 1994 on 22 August 1994 and he continued to serve in the House of Representatives as a frontbencher and spokesperson for Development Cooperation, Development aid and Kingdom Relations. After the Speaker of the House of Representatives Wim Deetman announced his resignation following his nomination as Mayor of The Hague, Bukman announced his candidacy to succeed him. Bukman won the election defeating party member and fellow frontbencher Ali Doelman-Pel and was elected as Speaker, taking office on 3 December 1996. On 23 September 1997 Bukman announced his retirement from national politics and that he wouldn't stand for the election of 1998 and continued to serve until the end of the parliamentary term on 19 May 1998.

Bukman retired after spending 17 years in national politics and became active in the private sector and public sector and occupied numerous seats as a corporate director and nonprofit director on several boards of directors and supervisory boards (International Food Policy Research Institute, LEI Wageningen UR, European Cultural Foundation and the World Food Programme).

Bukman was known for his abilities as a team leader and manager.

Electoral history

Decorations

References

External links

Official
  Drs. P. (Piet) Bukman Parlement & Politiek
  Drs. P. Bukman (CDA) Eerste Kamer der Staten-Generaal

 

 

 

 

 
 

1934 births
2022 deaths
Anti-Revolutionary Party politicians
Agriculturalists
Agricultural economists
Christian Democratic Appeal politicians
Chairmen of the Christian Democratic Appeal
Commanders of the Order of Orange-Nassau
Dutch corporate directors
Dutch expatriates in Belgium
Dutch expatriates in the United States
Dutch lobbyists
Dutch nonprofit directors
Dutch nonprofit executives
Dutch officials of the European Union
Dutch trade union leaders
Grand Crosses of the Order of the Crown (Belgium)
Grand Crosses with Star and Sash of the Order of Merit of the Federal Republic of Germany
Grand Officers of the Order of Merit of the Italian Republic
Grand Officiers of the Légion d'honneur
Members of the House of Representatives (Netherlands)
Members of the Senate (Netherlands)
Members of the Social and Economic Council
Ministers of Agriculture of the Netherlands
Ministers of Defence of the Netherlands
Ministers for Development Cooperation of the Netherlands
Speakers of the House of Representatives (Netherlands)
State Secretaries for Economic Affairs of the Netherlands
Vrije Universiteit Amsterdam alumni
Reformed Churches Christians from the Netherlands
Presidents of the European People's Party
Protestant Church Christians from the Netherlands
People from Delft
People from Voorschoten
20th-century Dutch businesspeople
20th-century Dutch diplomats
20th-century Dutch economists
20th-century Dutch politicians
21st-century Dutch businesspeople
21st-century Dutch diplomats
21st-century Dutch economists